Graceland Park is a neighborhood in southeastern Baltimore, Maryland, located adjacent O'Donnell Heights neighborhood. The neighborhood's western extreme is Gusryan Street, and it abuts the Baltimore City-Baltimore County line on the east. The Baltimore County portion, Harbor View, is adjacent the community of Dundalk.

References

External links

Graceland Park, Live Baltimore
Graceland Park Improvement Association
Graceland Park/O'Donnell Heights Elementary/Middle School

East Baltimore
Neighborhoods in Baltimore
Southeast Baltimore